The 2003 Mountain Dew Southern 500, the 54th running of the event, was a NASCAR Winston Cup Series race held on August 31, 2003 at Darlington Raceway in Darlington, South Carolina. Contested at 367 laps on the 1.366 mile (2.198 km) speedway, it was the twenty-fifth race of the 2003 NASCAR Winston Cup Series season. Terry Labonte of Hendrick Motorsports won the race. This would prove to be his 22nd and final Cup series win.

It is the last Southern 500 held on Labor Day weekend until 2015.

Background

Darlington Raceway, nicknamed by many NASCAR fans and drivers as "The Lady in Black" or "The Track Too Tough to Tame" and advertised as a "NASCAR Tradition", is a race track built for NASCAR racing located near Darlington, South Carolina. It is of a unique, somewhat egg-shaped design, an oval with the ends of very different configurations, a condition which supposedly arose from the proximity of one end of the track to a minnow pond the owner refused to relocate. This situation makes it very challenging for the crews to set up their cars' handling in a way that will be effective at both ends.

The track, Darlington Raceway,  is a four-turn  oval. The track's first two turns are banked at twenty-five degrees, while the final two turns are banked two degrees lower at twenty-three degrees. The front stretch (the location of the finish line) and the back stretch is banked at six degrees. Darlington Raceway can seat up to 60,000 people.

Top 10 results

Race Statistics
 Time of race: 4:09:08
 Average Speed:  
 Pole Speed: 
 Cautions: 10 for 55 laps 
 Margin of Victory: 1.651 sec 
 Lead changes: 24  
 Percent of race run under caution: 15.0%            
 Average green flag run: 28.4 laps

References

Mountain Dew Southern 500
Mountain Dew Southern 500
NASCAR races at Darlington Raceway
Mountain Dew Southern 500